The 1989–90 Segunda Divisão season was the 56th season of recognised second-tier football in Portugal. It was the last regionalized contest for the second tier championship, as a new Segunda Liga took shape as an unified second tier from the next season onwards.

Overview
The league was contested by 54 teams in 3 divisions with SC Salgueiros, Gil Vicente FC and SC Farense winning the respective divisional competitions and gaining promotion to the Primeira Liga.  The overall championship was won by SC Salgueiros.

League standings

Segunda Divisão - Zona Norte

Segunda Divisão - Zona Centro

Segunda Divisão - Zona Sul

Play-offs

Championship play-off

Segunda Divisão de Honra play-off

Segunda Divisão B play-off
The last 4 classified in each series competed for against the teams classified in 6th place in each of the 6 series of the III Divisão and the 2 best 7th classified of the 6 series of the III Divisão (CD Fátima and Moura), in one hand. The 10 winners qualified for 1990–91 Segunda Divisão B , while the losers competed in 1990–91 Terceira Divisão.

References

External links
 Portuguese Division Two «B» - footballzz.co.uk

Portuguese Second Division seasons
Port
2